The Ibaloi language belongs to the Malayo-Polynesian branch of the Austronesian languages family. It is closely related to the Pangasinan language, which is spoken primarily in central and southern Benguet, and western Nueva Vizcaya and eastern La Union. Its dialects include Daklan, Kabayan, and Bokod.

Ibaloi phonemes are similar to those found in other Philippine languages with a few exceptions.

Phonology

Ibaloi is one of the Philippine languages that do not exhibit []-[d] allophony.

References

A handy guidebook to the Ibaloi language. Baguio City, Philippines: Tebtebba Foundation, 2010.

External links
Ibaloy orthography
Ibaloy-language word list from the Austronesian Basic Vocabulary Database 

Languages of Benguet
Languages of Nueva Vizcaya
South–Central Cordilleran languages